A list films produced in Pakistan in 2003 (see 2003 in film) and in the Urdu language:

2003

See also
2003 in Pakistan

External links
 Search Pakistani film - IMDB.com

2003
Pakistani
Films